Albert D'Souza is a Catholic (Latin Church) prelate in India who served as the tenth Archbishop of Agra from 16 February 2007 to 12 November 2020.

Birth and education 
He was born on 4 August 1945 in Moodubelle, Mangalore, as the eighth child in a Catholic family with a dozen children. Four of his brothers are priests and two of them bishops. One of the brothers, Fr. Edwin D'Souza, is the pastor of Saints Martha and Mary Parish, Mississuaga, Ontario.

He studied in church run St. Lawrence High School, Moodubelle.

Clerical career 

He was ordained a priest on 8 December 1974, and was appointed Bishop of Lucknow on 21 November 1992. His episcopal ordination followed on 7 February 1993. Pope Benedict XVI appointed him Archbishop of Agra on 11 April 2007. He chairs the commission of the Conference of Catholic Bishops of India (CCBI).
He also chairs the Agra Regional Bishops' Council (ARBC)

See also 
Catholic Church in India

References

External links 

21st-century Roman Catholic archbishops in India
1945 births
Living people
Christian clergy from Mangalore
Indian Roman Catholic archbishops